Lemay or LeMay may refer to:

People
 Curtis LeMay (1906–1990), United States Air Force general
 Dorothy LeMay, American "adult" actress
 Harding Lemay (1922–2018), American teleplay writer and playwright
 Harold LeMay (1919–2000), American collector
 John D. LeMay (born 1962), American actor
 Leo Lemay (1935–2008), American educator
 Leo Lemay (bishop) (1909–1983), American Roman Catholic bishop
 Luc Lemay, Canadian singer and guitarist
 Lucille Lemay (born 1950), Canadian archer
 Lynda Lemay (born 1966), Canadian francophone singer
 Marc Lemay (born 1951), Canadian politician
 Martin Lemay (born 1964), Quebec politician
 Moe Lemay (born 1962), Canadian ice hockey player

Places
 Lemay, Missouri, United States

Museums
 LeMay - America's Car Museum

Companies
 Lemay (Architects), a Canadian architecture firm